Anne Scheiber (October 1, 1893 – January 9, 1995) was an American IRS auditor and a post-mortem philanthropist who was known for her unconventional way of obtaining wealth. Though she never earned a salary of more than $4,000 per year, she amassed a fortune of $22 million through frugal living and investing.

Career
Anne Scheiber was an unknown, reclusive and extremely frugal New York woman who worked as an auditor for the United States Internal Revenue Service, retiring from the IRS in 1944. She never earned a salary of more than $4,000 per year, and although she was an exemplary worker, she never received a promotion. This likely reflected discrimination towards women in the workforce in general during that period, as well as attitudes of antisemitism that were endemic in elite American institutions in the mid-20th century, including the U.S. government. Despite her experiences with discrimination, Scheiber's life became noteworthy for her accomplishment as an extremely skillful investor during her 50 years of retirement, and ultimately as a surprise philanthropist in support of women's education.

Scheiber was born in Brooklyn, New York, and lived to the age of 101. She had nine siblings, but apparently had few close family members or friends and never married. Her father died when she was young, and she was raised by her mother, and thus began working in her teen years to earn money. Despite the difficulties of her early years, Scheiber managed to graduate both from college and law school, but chose to work as an auditor with the IRS. Her only known acquaintances were Ben Clark, her attorney, and William Fay, her broker at Merrill Lynch.

In her early adult years, Scheiber had a series of negative experiences with financial brokers in the 1930s, and eventually retired from her job as an auditor at the IRS in the mid-1940s, with only $5,000 saved up and a $3,100 annual pension. She then spent the next 50 years studying the markets and accumulating wealth while living in her frugal New York apartment. By making a series of wise financial investments, share purchases, and savings, Scheiber managed to accumulate a net worth of $22 million by the end of her life. Despite her extensive wealth, she had a reputation for frugality and eccentricity, including one incident in which she took food from a meeting of shareholders and consumed it over the next three days. At the end of her life, she lived in the same apartment and wore the same clothing that she did in 1944. After her death in 1995 at the age of 101, she donated her fortune to establishing scholarships for women at Yeshiva University's Stern College for Women, and the Albert Einstein College of Medicine, with the intention of enabling younger women to overcome the discrimination that she herself had endured during her working years. Her gift shocked and surprised many, not only for its size but that its source came from a donor who was unknown and lived in virtual obscurity.

Scheiber's investment strategy developed over her lifetime has become known in recent years as a premier example of the "buy and hold" philosophy of investing in businesses. She became an astute student of the markets, likely benefiting from her prior work as a tax auditor, applied and exemplified a very tax-efficient strategy of investing in high quality companies for long-term growth, and selling few of her investments during her lifetime, thus avoiding significant tax payments on capital gains. Upon bequeathal of her entire fortune to Yeshiva University at the time of her death, she ensured that little taxes were ever paid to her former employer, other than small payments on dividends and on her modest pension. With this feat she can be considered one of the great equity investors of the 20th century, as well as a noteworthy philanthropist in supporting educational opportunities for women.

Her executor, Benjamin Clark, said that the claims about Scheiber's investing skill have been exaggerated. Her 1936 tax return showed dividend income of $900, which would indicate she had a substantial portfolio several years before her retirement. If her stocks earned an average dividend yield for 1936, her portfolio would have been about $21,000. Investing $21,000 for almost 60 years and winding up with $22 million indicates a return slightly higher than the S&P 500.

References

External links
 How Anne Schieber Amassed Her Fortune
 The Most Successful Dividend Investors of all times

1893 births
1995 deaths
20th-century American businesspeople
20th-century American philanthropists
Internal Revenue Service people